The Ezra Stiles House is an historic house at 14 Clarke Street in Newport, Rhode Island. It is a large -story wood-frame structure, five bays wide, with a gambrel roof and two large interior brick chimneys, built in 1756. Originally built facing south, the house was rotated on its lot to face west in 1834, at which time its entry was given a Greek Revival surround.

The house was home from the time of its construction to Rev. Ezra Stiles, later president of Yale University. Stiles lived in the house while serving as a minister for 20 years at the Second Congregational Church on Clarke Street. Stiles owned a slave boy that he acquired through an investment in a slaving expedition. Stiles freed his slave when he left Newport to serve at Yale in 1777. Stiles House is currently a private residence and was added to the National Register of Historic Places in 1972.

See also

National Register of Historic Places listings in Newport County, Rhode Island

References

Davis, "Buying and Selling the Human Species:Newport and the Slave Trade,""Providence Journal" (March 12, 2006)

Houses on the National Register of Historic Places in Rhode Island
Houses in Newport, Rhode Island
National Register of Historic Places in Newport County, Rhode Island
Historic district contributing properties in Rhode Island
Houses completed in 1756
Greek Revival houses in Rhode Island